Gamma Serpentis (γ Serpentis, γ Ser) is a star in the equatorial constellation Serpens, in the part of the constellation that represents the serpent's head (Serpens Caput). It has an apparent visual magnitude +3.85, which means it is visible to the naked eye. Based upon parallax measurements by the Hipparcos spacecraft, this star is approximately 36.7 light years from Earth.

Properties

Gamma Serpentis is an ordinary F-type main sequence star with a stellar classification of F6 V. It is larger and more massive than the Sun, with three times the solar luminosity. Based upon its mass, it may have a convection zone in its core region. The projected rotational velocity along the equator is 10.2 km/s. It is younger than the Sun with an estimated age of 3.5 billion years. The effective temperature of the star's outer atmosphere is 6,350 K, giving it the yellow-white-hued glow of an F-type star.

Occasionally Gamma Serpentis is listed as having two 10th magnitude companions, but it appears that these stars are just optical neighbours.

Etymology
It was a member of indigenous Arabic asterism al-Nasaq al-Sha'āmī, "the Northern Line" of al-Nasaqān "the Two Lines", along with β Her (Kornephoros), γ Her (Hejian, Ho Keen) and β Ser (Chow).

According to the catalogue of stars in the Technical Memorandum 33-507 - A Reduced Star Catalog Containing 537 Named Stars, al-Nasaq al-Sha'āmī or Nasak Shamiya were the title for three stars:β Ser as Nasak Shamiya I, γ Ser as Nasak Shamiya II, γ Her as Nasak Shamiya III (exclude β Her). The star was later given the proper name Ainalhai, from the Arabic عين الحية  ‘Ayn al-Ḥayyah "the Serpent's Eye".

References

External links
 Gamma Serpentis by Professor Jim Kaler.

Serpentis, Gamma
Serpens (constellation)
F-type main-sequence stars
Serpentis, Gamma
Triple stars
Serpentis, 41
078072
Suspected variables
5933
142860
Durchmusterung objects